Thousand Lights is a multi-domed mosque in Anna Salai in Chennai, Tamil Nadu, India, is one of the largest mosques in the country and is a revered place of worship and azadari for Shia Muslims in the city.

History
The mosque was built in 1810 by Arcot Nawab Umdat ul-Umara. It was constructed in medieval architecture. The site of the mosque was previously occupied by an assembly hall. There was a tradition of lighting thousand oil lamps to illuminate the assembly hall. The mosque thus gets its name from this tradition.

The chief Shia Qazi of Chennai functions from the mosque, and the post has been continuously held by the same family.

References

External links
 chennai.org.uk
 indiafascinates.com

Mosques in Chennai
Religious buildings and structures completed in 1810
Shia mosques in India